Cnemaspis pava is a species of diurnal gecko endemic to island of Sri Lanka.

References

 http://reptile-database.reptarium.cz/species?genus=Cnemaspis&species=pava
 https://www.inaturalist.org/taxa/Cnemaspis_pava
 https://web.archive.org/web/20141004183323/http://www.srilankanreptiles.com/TetrapodReptiles/Gekkonidae.html

Reptiles of Sri Lanka
Reptiles described in 2007
pava